Lindsey E. Park  is a Canadian politician from Ontario. She was elected to the Legislative Assembly of Ontario in the 2018 provincial election to represents the riding of Durham, initially as a member of the Progressive Conservative Party of Ontario before resigning from the caucus in October 2021. She sat as an independent MPP for the remainder of her term and did not seek re-election in the 2022 election.

Background
Park is the daughter of former professional hockey goalie Jim Park. She grew up in Thornhill, Ontario, and earned a Bachelor of Science at Wayne State University, where she was a goaltender for the NCAA Division I Wayne State Warriors women's ice hockey team, finishing her collegiate career in 2010 as Wayne State's then-all-time leader in career save percentage (.912) and goals-against average. She later studied law at the University of Ottawa, where she got her start in politics working for then-Thornhill MP and Minister of the Environment Peter Kent, and then practiced civil litigation in Durham Region.

Politics
Park was elected to the Legislative Assembly of Ontario as a Progressive Conservative MPP in the 2018 provincial election for the electoral district of Durham on June 7, 2018.

On June 29, 2018, Park was named parliamentary assistant to the attorney general, Caroline Mulroney.

On October 1, 2021, Park was removed from her role as parliamentary assistant to the attorney general after the government house leader Paul Calandra alleged that Park had "misrepresented her vaccination status".

On October 22, 2021, Park released a statement denying Calandra's claim and accusing him of issuing a "false statement". Citing a "breakdown in trust", Park also announced her resignation from the Progressive Conservative Party caucus. Park did not seek re-election in 2022.

Electoral record

References

Progressive Conservative Party of Ontario MPPs
21st-century Canadian politicians
Living people
21st-century Canadian women politicians
Women MPPs in Ontario
Lawyers in Ontario
Year of birth missing (living people)
Wayne State Warriors athletes
Wayne State University alumni
University of Ottawa Faculty of Law alumni
Independent MPPs in Ontario